Seravezza is a town and comune in the Province of Lucca, in northern Tuscany, Italy. It is located in Versilia, close to the Apuan Alps.

Neighboring municipalities
Forte dei Marmi
Massa
Montignoso
Pietrasanta
Stazzema

Patron saints
Seravezza's patron saint is St. Lawrence. His feast occurs annually on 10 August.

According to historian Lorenzo Marcuccetti the battle remembered by historian Titus Livius of 186 BC was fought between apuan Ligures and Romans in Ponte Stazzemese. The battle was fought on a hill named Colle Marcio (Marcio Hill) from the name of the defeated consul: Quintus Marcius.

The frazione of Querceta has St. Joseph, celebrated on 19 March. The patron saint of the frazione of Pozzi is St. Roch.

Sister cities
Seravezza is twinned with:

  Calatorao, Spain

Notable people
Marco Balderi, conductor
Renato Salvatori, actor
Dino Bigongiari, professor of Columbia University

References

External links
 

Cities and towns in Tuscany